Southern Harbour is a town in the province of Newfoundland and Labrador, Canada. The town had a population of 369 in the Canada 2016 Census.

Demographics 

See also
 List of cities and towns in Newfoundland and Labrador

References 

Towns in Newfoundland and Labrador